Troy is an unincorporated community in Davis County, Iowa, United States.

O. F. Goddard, a Montana Supreme Court justice, was born in Troy.

The Troy Academy is in Troy.

Notes

Unincorporated communities in Davis County, Iowa
Unincorporated communities in Iowa